was a gigantic yōkai in Japanese mythology, sometimes said to pose as a mountain range when sleeping.

Mythology
The size of a Daidarabotchi was so great that his footprints were said to have created innumerable lakes and ponds. In one legend, a Daidarabotchi weighed Mount Fuji and Mount Tsukuba to see which was heavier, but he accidentally split Tsukuba's peak after he was finished with it.

The Hitachi no Kuni Fudoki, a recording of the imperial customs in the Hitachi Province compiled in the 8th century, also told of a Daidarabotchi living on a hill west of a post office of Hiratsu Ogushi who fed on giant clams from the beach, piling the shells on top of a hill.

Izumo no Kuni Fudoki also mentions a legendary king of Izumo, Ōmitsunu, who was the grandson of Susanoo and a demi-god. Having the strength of a giant, he performed Kuni-biki, pulling land from Silla with ropes, to increase the size of his territory.

See also
Regigigas

Japanese folklore
Japanese giants
Yōkai

pt:Anexo:Lista de artigos mínimos de Youkais#Daidara-bocchi